Raymond Waring (born 21 July 1977) is an English actor. He was born in Liverpool and grew up in Runcorn, Cheshire, where he attended St. Chad's Secondary School. In 1994, he was accepted into the National Youth Theatre of Great Britain and, in 1997, attended the Guildhall School of Music & Drama. He also trained with the renowned Alain Knapp.

Raymond has appeared in numerous films including submerged, Lucky Break directed by Peter Cattaneo, as well as collaborating with Michael Winterbottom on the films 24 Hour Party People, A Cock and Bull Story and The Look of Love. He has appeared in Sally Potter's Yes. He appeared in the box office smash 28 Weeks Later and horror thriller Intruders, both directed by Juan Carlos Fresnadillo.

In 2022, waring appeared as Steve Hart in the Hillsborough disaster miniseries Anne, alongside Maxine Peake who played Anne.

Filmography

References

External links

Living people
1977 births
English male film actors
Male actors from Liverpool
People from Runcorn
Alumni of the Guildhall School of Music and Drama
National Youth Theatre members